"It's OK" (spelled  "It's O.K." on the album disc inlay) is a song by the American rock band the Beach Boys from their 1976 album 15 Big Ones. Written by Brian Wilson and Mike Love, it is an upbeat song about celebrating summer fun. It was issued as a single on August 9, 1976 (with the B-side "Had to Phone Ya") and reached number 29 on the Billboard Hot 100 singles chart.

Background and recording
"It's OK" is an upbeat song about celebrating summer fun that was written by Brian Wilson and Mike Love. Brian commented of the song in a 1995 interview, "That was written inside Brother Studios in Santa Monica. At the end, where Dennis goes (sings) "Find a ride", we put two of his voices on there, and it sounded fan-tas-tic! Fuckin' fantastic from Dennis." On another occasion, he praised Love's lyrics, but said that the song "doesn't bring back real pleasant memories."

Sessions for the song commenced at Brother Studios in October 1974, notably featuring members of Wizzard who were staying in Los Angeles at the end of their only U.S. tour. Contrary to the credits on the back of the 15 Big Ones album, bandleader Roy Wood played drums, not saxophone.

Legacy
In the United States, the song was the highest-charting original single that the Beach Boys released between "Do It Again" (which peaked at number 20 in 1968) and "Getcha Back" (which peaked at number 26 in 1985); however, "Almost Summer" (a song written by Wilson, Love, and Al Jardine for the sidegroup Celebration) reached number 28 in 1978, while "The Beach Boys Medley" (which also interpolates the band's 1965 cover of "Barbara Ann") peaked at number 12 in 1981. "It's O.K." later reappeared as the B-side to the 1985 single "It's Gettin' Late".

Record World said that "it works remarkably well" and called it a "summer celebration as only [the Beach Boys] know how to produce."

In 2019, Love re-recorded "It's O.K." for his album 12 Sides of Summer. Wilson also re-recorded the track for the soundtrack to the documentary Brian Wilson: Long Promised Road (2021).

Personnel
Per 2000 liner notes and Dillon.

The Beach Boys
 Al Jardine – backing vocals
 Mike Love – lead and backing vocals
 Brian Wilson – backing vocals, piano, organ, Moog bass
 Carl Wilson – backing vocals, guitar
 Dennis Wilson – backing vocals, drums
 Ricky Fataar – drums

Additional musicians and production staff
 Dennis Dreith – clarinet
 Jules Jacobs – clarinet
 Marilyn Wilson – backing vocals
 Roy Wood – drums
 Mike Burney - saxophone
 Nick Pentelow - saxophone

References

External links
 

1976 singles
The Beach Boys songs
Songs written by Brian Wilson
Songs written by Mike Love
Song recordings produced by Brian Wilson
Reprise Records singles